Al-Jama'a al-Islamiyya, "Islamic Group", may refer to:
 Al-Jama'a al-Islamiyya, the Egyptian Sunni Islamist movement
 Al-Jamā'ah al-Islāmiyyah al-Aḥmadiyyah, alternative name for the Ahmadiyya movement
 Jemaah Islamiyah, a Southeast Asian organization
 al-Jama'ah al-Islamiyah al-Musallaha, Islamist insurgent group in Algeria
 Al-Jama'a al-Islamiyya (Lebanon), Sunni Islamist political party in Lebanon
 Al-Jama’a al-Islamiyyah al-Muqatilah bi-Libya, the armed Islamist group in Libya
 Al-Jama'a al-Islamiyya al-Kurdistaniya

See also
 Jamaat-e-Islami (disambiguation)